Paul Hector Provandie (1875-1931) was an American physician and politician, who served as the  mayor of Melrose, Massachusetts.

References 

Mayors of Melrose, Massachusetts
People from Melrose, Massachusetts
1931 deaths
1875 births